William Post Jr. (February 19, 1901 – September 26, 1989) was an American actor and drama instructor. He was sometimes billed without the use of "Jr." following his surname.

Early life 
Post was born February 19, 1901, in Montclair, New Jersey. He was educated at the Phillips-Exeter Academy and Yale University. After graduating from Yale, he studied acting at the American Laboratory Theatre.

Career 
In the 1930s and 1940s, Post appeared in motion pictures and Broadway productions in supporting roles of varied prominence, but was notable as one of the six actors to portray the character of John Perry on the radio soap opera, John's Other Wife.

His acting career from the early 1950s onward, however, was spent exclusively and extensively in television. He portrayed Harry Henderson on the TV version of Beulah and Harley Naughton on the TV version of Claudia. On March 6, 1949, he had the title role in a Studio One production of Julius Caesar. His appearances on Broadway Television Theatre included productions of "The Night Cap", "The Fortune Hunter", "Three Cornered Moon". "The Letter", "The Enchanged Cottage", "Smilin' Through", and "Reflected Glory".

On Broadway, Post appeared in Richard III (1953), Love Goes to Press (1947), Calico Wedding (1945), My Sister Eileen (1940), Boyd's Daughter (1940), Madame Capet (1938), The Merry Wives of Windsor (1938), Many Mansions (1937), King Richard II (1937), Three Wise Fools (1936), A Touch of Brimstone (1935), The Eldest (1935), Strangers at Home (1934), Ah, Wilderness! (1933), When the Bough Breaks (1932), A Glass of Water (1930), Seventh Heaven (1922), and Thank You (1921).

Post additionally served for 25 years as the head of the drama department at Finch College, a women's college in Manhattan.

Personal life 
On September 11, 1941, Post married actress Joan Castle. He married his second wife, Doris ?, in ?

Death 
A resident of Granite, Oklahoma, in his later years, Post died at the age of 88 at the Presbyterian Hospital in Oklahoma City of chronic obstructive pulmonary disease. He was survived by his second wife, Doris, and his brother, Robert.

Selected filmography

Film 
The Black Camel (1931) - Alan Jaynes
Secret Service (1931) - Lieutenant Henry Dumont
Birth of a Baby (1938) - John Burgess
Babes on Broadway (1941) - Announcer
Mr. and Mrs. North (1942) - Gerald P. North
Ship Ahoy (1942) - H. U. Bennet
Pacific Rendezvous (1942) - Lanny
Sherlock Holmes and the Secret Weapon (1942) - Dr. Franz Tobel
The Moon is Down (1943) - Alex Morden
Roger Touhy, Gangster (1944) - Joseph P. Sutton
Bride by Mistake (1944) - Donald
Experiment Perilous (1944) - District Attorney
The House on 92nd Street (1945) - Walker

Television 

The Borden Show (1947); 1 ep. "The Dangerous Man"
Studio One in Hollywood (1947); 1 ep. "Julius Caesar" - Julius Caesar
NBC Presents (1949); 1 ep. "My Wife is a Liar"
The Clock (1949); 1 ep. "Mark Wade, D.A."
Lights Out (1951); 1 ep. "Promise"
The Philco Television Playhouse (1949); 3 eps. "The Queen Bee," "For Love or Money," "Romeo and Juliet" - Capulet
Colgate Theatre (1950); 3 eps. "South Wind," "Blackmail," "Two for a Penny"
The Chevrolet Tele-Theatre (1950); 1 ep. "The Brave Man with a Cord"
Masterpiece Playhouse (1950); 1 ep. "Richard III"
Cameo Theatre (1950); 1 ep. "A Point of View"
Robert Montgomery Presents (1950); 1 ep. "The Letter" - Geoffrey Hammond
The Philco Television Playhouse (1951); 1 ep. "Parnassus on Wheels"
Lights Out (1951); 1 ep. "Dead Man's Coat" - Francis
Hallmark Hall of Fame (1952); 1 ep. "Prelude" - Roberts
Line of Duty (1952); TV Movie
Broadway Television Theatre (1952); 2 eps. "Three Cornered Moon" - Dr. Alan Stevens, "The Fortune Hunter" - Charles Trowbridge
Beulah (1950-1952); Recurring role in 6 eps. - Harry Henderson
Robert Montgomery Presents (1953); 1 ep. "Appointment in Samarra"
Broadway Television Theatre (1954); 1 ep. "Reflected Glory"
The Edge of Night (1964) - Mr. Hull
West Point (1957); 1 ep. "Ambush"
Harbormaster (1958); 1 ep. "Experiment with a Traitor" - Commander Gilmer
Armstrong Circle Theatre (1958); 2 eps. "Twelve Cases of Murder," "Thirty Days to Reconsider" - Stephen James
Young Dr. Malone (1961-1963); Recurring role - Harold Cranston
Sunday Showcase (1959); Role in two-part episode "What Makes Sammy Run?" - Lucky Westover
Miracle on 34th Street (1959); TV Movie - Mr. Gimbel
Armstrong Circle Theatre (1959); 1 ep. "The Jailbreak"
Naked City (1960); 1 ep. "A Succession of Heartbeats" - Meredith Linus
Everglades! (1962); 1 ep. "Hideout" - Dan Erickson
Armstrong Circle Theatre (1962); 1 ep. "Journey to Oblivion" - Nick Logan
Route 66 (1963); 1 ep. "Where Are the Sounds of Celli Brahms?" - Mr. Savel
Love Is a Many Splendored Thing (1968-1971); Recurring role - Chandler Garrison #2
You Are There (1971); 1 ep. "The Mystery of Amelia Earhart" - Putnam
Where the Heart Is (1971-1973); Recurring role - Dr. Joe Prescott
The Edge of Night (1974-1975); Recurring role - Walter LePage
First Ladies Diaries: Edith Wilson (1976); TV movie - Senator Hitchcock

References

External links 

 

1901 births
1989 deaths
20th-century American male actors
American male film actors
American male radio actors
American male stage actors
American male television actors
American soap opera actors
Male actors from New Jersey
People from Montclair, New Jersey
Yale University alumni